Edmond D. Pope is a retired American intelligence officer-turned-businessman, convicted by a Russian court in 2000 on charges of spying for the U.S. Defense Intelligence Agency (DIA). He was sentenced to 20 years in prison for buying up and smuggling classified military equipment out of the country as scrap metal. 253 days into his custody, Pope was pardoned by the newly elected Russian President Vladimir Putin as US government claimed that Pope had a rare form of bone cancer. Pope has always maintained his innocence and continues to assert that the Russian authorities used him as a scapegoat for their broken system.

In an interview with CNN, Pope spoke of a plot by unspecified people in the US, as well as the KGB and the Russian mafia, as a part of which Pope was being slowly poisoned in the Lefortovo Prison. Pope asserted that this was done with the hopes that he would eventually have to be transferred to a hospital, abducted on his way, and smuggled out of the country. Pope claims that Congressman John E. Peterson and Pope's wife "learned of this plot and put a stop to it before it was carried out," for which he was grateful.

Book
A book recounting his experience was published in 2001.

See also 
 VA-111 Shkval

References

Living people
People of the Defense Intelligence Agency
American spies
Espionage in Russia
Year of birth missing (living people)